Adenanthos venosus is a species of flowering plant in the family Proteaceae and is endemic to a restricted part of the southwest of Western Australia. It is an openly-branched shrub with clustered egg-shaped leaves and reddish flowers.

Description
and sessile. The leaves are mostly glabrous and have a pointed tip. The flowers are dull crimson to pinkish purple with a cream-coloured band in the centre and many glandular hairs on the outside. Flowering occurs from August to November.

Taxonomy
Adenanthos venosus was first formally described in 1856 by Carl Meissner in de Candolle's Prodromus Systematis Naturalis Regni Vegetabilis from specimens collected by James Drummond in the Swan River Colony. The specific epithet (venosus) means "with prominent veins".

Distribution
This species grows among quartzite rocks and on rocky sandstone ridges in the Fitzgerald River National Park in the south-west of Western Australia.

Conservation status
This adenanthos is list as "not threatened" by the Western Australian Government Department of Biodiversity, Conservation and Attractions.

References

venosus
Endemic flora of Southwest Australia
Taxa named by Carl Meissner
Plants described in 1856